The Municipal Services Standards Committee (NKT) of the German Institute for Standardization (DIN) is responsible for standardisation in the field of waste management and city cleaning. It chairs a number of European standardisation committees (CEN) and it issues specifications on technical and logistical aspects in waste handling, road cleaning, highway maintenance and winter service.

Organization 
The full title is "" (standards committee on municipal engineering) "" (in the DIN German institute for standardisation). The NKT was founded on 26. November 1968 in Frankfurt on the initiative of the municipal authority associations like the "VKS im VKU" (full title "" / association on municipal waste management and city cleaning) and the "BDE" (full title "" / federal association of German waste management, water management and natural resources).

The current organization is substructured in five departements ( - basics;  - containers;  - vehicles;   - facilities;  - electronic data processing) running 29 projects. There are 106 national standards and 9 recommendations created by the NKT. The NKT is member of 31 national standardization boards, 10 European standardization boards and 2 international standardization boards.

Standards 
 DIN 30722 on roller containers also used in containerized firefighting equipment
 DIN EN 840 on mobile waste and recycling containers 
 DIN EN 12574 on stationary waste containers

External links 
 http://www.nkt.din.de/

Deutsches Institut für Normung
1968 establishments in Germany